The Cotaco Opera House, also known as Masonic Building, was the first opera house constructed in the state of Alabama.  It is located at 115 Johnston Street in historic downtown Decatur, Alabama.

In 1889, the city of Decatur was the largest city in North Alabama, out-sizing Huntsville.  It had become increasingly apparent that the city was in need of a theater to showcase its fine arts. The Opera House was built on a 100 by 140 foot site that ran south from Johnston Street and fronting on the east side of 1st Avenue. It was built by the Cotaco Opera House Company, which was incorporated on September 16, 1889.

See also
National Register of Historic Places listings in Morgan County, Alabama

References

National Register of Historic Places in Morgan County, Alabama
Theatres in Alabama
Buildings and structures in Decatur, Alabama
Theatres on the National Register of Historic Places in Alabama
Opera houses on the National Register of Historic Places
Event venues on the National Register of Historic Places in Alabama
Opera houses in Alabama